Fransiskus Tuaman Sinaga (born 22 November 1972) is the bishop-elect of Roman Catholic Diocese of Sibolga in Indonesia. He was appointed by Pope Francis on 6 March 2021 to succeed Ludovikus Simanullang, who died in 2018. Fransiskus received his episcopal ordination from Ignatius Suharyo Hardjoatmodjo on 29 July 2021.

References 

1972 births
21st-century Roman Catholic bishops in Indonesia
Living people
Bishops appointed by Pope Francis
People from North Sumatra